Julie Ribault (March 27, 1789, in Fresnay-sur-Sarthe – November 26, 1885 in Paris) was a French painter, engraver, and illustrator. She was a genre painter and portrait painter, having studied under Louis Lafitte. Today, her works are a part of the collections of the Musée Bonnat.

References 

1789 births
1885 deaths
French painters
French engravers
French illustrators